Ghemawat is an Indian surname.

Notable people with this surname include:
 Pankaj Ghemawat (born 1959), Indian-American economist
 Sanjay Ghemawat (born 1966), Indian-American computer scientist

References